Deuterated solvents are a group of compounds where one or more hydrogen atoms are substituted by deuterium atoms.

These compounds are often used in nuclear magnetic resonance spectroscopy.

Examples

 Heavy water
 Deuterated acetone
 Deuterated benzene
 Deuterated chloroform
 Deuterated dichloromethane
 Deuterated DMF
 Deuterated DMSO
 Deuterated ethanol
 Deuterated methanol
 Deuterated THF

References